Ninoy Aquino International Airport (NAIA ,  ;  or Pandaigdigang Paliparan ng Ninoy Aquino), originally known as Manila International Airport (MIA), is the main international airport serving the city of Manila and the metropolitan area of the same name. Named after Senator Ninoy Aquino (1932–1983) who was assassinated at the airport on August 21, 1983, it is managed by the Manila International Airport Authority (MIAA), an agency of the Department of Transportation (DOTr).

Officially, NAIA is the only airport serving the Metro Manila area. However, in practice, both NAIA and Clark International Airport, located in the Clark Freeport Zone in Pampanga, serve the metropolis, with Clark catering mostly to low-cost carriers because of its lower landing fees compared to those charged at NAIA. In the recent past, there have been calls for Clark to replace NAIA eventually as the primary airport of the Philippines. In an effort to reduce congestion at the airport, two new airports are being constructed: New Manila International Airport, located in Bulacan to serve both Metro Manila and Central Luzon, and Sangley Point Airport, located on reclaimed land in Cavite City. The completion of either airport would relieve pressure on NAIA's existing infrastructure.

NAIA has been operating beyond its designed capacity of 35 million passengers, causing air traffic congestion and flight delays. The airport has been tagged by The Guide to Sleeping In Airports, luggage storage app Bounce, and travel blog Hawaiian Islands as one of the worst airports in the world and Asia-Pacific. Since 2018, plans to privatize and improve the airport have been pitched, and were revived again in 2023 following a major malfunction in the airport's air traffic control system.

History

Early history
The original airport that served Manila, Grace Park Airfield (also known as Manila North) in Grace Park, Caloocan (then a municipality of Rizal), was opened in 1935. It was the city's first commercial airport and was used by Philippine Aerial Taxi Company (later Philippine Airlines) for its first domestic routes. In July 1937, Nielson Airport, located in the  land in Makati, also then in Rizal, was inaugurated and served as the gateway to Manila; its runways now form Ayala Avenue and Paseo de Roxas. Following the end of World War II and Philippine independence from the United States, Grace Park Airfield closed, whereas Nielson Airport continued to operate until 1948, when it was decommissioned and all airport operations were moved to the current site, Nichols Field, due to the easier terrain gradient, expanse of greenfield land, and the USAF base runway (Runway 13/31) which could be used for the airport. The original structure, designed by Frederico Illustre, was built on what is now the site of Terminal 2.

In 1954, the airport's longer international runway (Runway 06/24) and associated taxiways were built, and in 1956, construction was started on a control tower and a terminal building for international passengers. The new terminal was inaugurated on September 22, 1961. On January 22, 1972, a fire caused substantial damage to the original terminal building, which also resulted in six casualties, and a slightly smaller terminal was rebuilt in its place the following year. This second terminal would serve as the country's international terminal until 1981 when it was converted to a domestic terminal, upon the completion and opening of a new, higher-capacity terminal, known today as Terminal 1. The old international terminal was later damaged by another fire in May 1985.

Assassination of Ninoy Aquino and renaming

One year after its opening, the present-day Terminal 1 became the scene of a controversial event in Philippine history on August 21, 1983. Benigno "Ninoy" Aquino Jr. was assassinated at the terminal's Gate 8 (now Gate 11) after returning to the Philippines from his self-imposed exile in the United States. Aviation Security Command (AVSECOM) personnel escorted Aquino out of the plane to the tarmac where a van owned by the agency awaited him. A single gunshot was heard, which was then identified as the shot that killed Aquino. Several shots burst out, killing the alleged assassin, Rolando Galman. Seconds later, a barrage of gunfire erupted, causing chaos in the plane, the tarmac, and the terminal. The bodies of Aquino and Galman lay on the tarmac; Aquino's body was loaded onto the van, which then sped away. Ironically, his flight number, China Airlines 811, was the same flight number that was involved in an accident three years ago at the same airport, although the aircraft involved in the 1983 assassination was a Boeing 767-200. Four years after the incident, during the presidency of Ninoy's widow Corazon Aquino in 1987, Republic Act No. 6639 was enacted without executive approval, renaming the airport in Ninoy's honor. Presently, a body mark of Aquino's assassination is on display at the departures area while the spot at Gate 8 where he was killed has a memorial plaque. Due to this event, Terminal 1 has also been nicknamed "Ninoy Aquino Terminal".

Expansion
Plans for a new terminal were conceived in 1989, when the Department of Transportation and Communications commissioned Aéroports de Paris to conduct a feasibility study to expand capacity. The recommendation was to build two new terminals. The government aims to return services from many of the airlines which cancelled services to Manila as a result of Terminal 1's problems.

Construction of Terminal 2 began in 1995 and was opened in 1999. Terminal 2 was nicknamed the "Centennial Terminal" as its completion in 1998 coincided with the 100th anniversary of the Philippine Declaration of Independence from Spain.

The original proposal for the construction of a third terminal was proposed by Asia's Emerging Dragon Corporation (AEDP). AEDP eventually lost the bid to PairCargo and its partner Fraport AG of Germany, who went on to begin construction of the terminal under the administration of Joseph Estrada. In August 1997, President Fidel V. Ramos led the groundbreaking ceremony of Terminal 3. The structure was mostly completed several years before, and was originally scheduled to open in, 2002. However, a legal dispute between the government of the Philippines and the project's main contractor, Philippine International Air Terminals Co. Inc. (Piatco), over the build-operate-transfer contract, delayed the final completion and opening of the terminal. After several delays, Terminal 3 partially opened on July 22, 2008. Full operations were initially slated to begin by 2010, then pushed back to 2011, and again to 2014. Terminal 3 became fully operational on July 31, 2014.

Terminal 3 controversies
While the original agreement was one in which PairCargo and Fraport AG would operate the airport for several years after its construction, followed by a handing over of the terminal to the Philippine government, the government offered to buy out Fraport AG for $400 million, to which Fraport agreed. However, before the terminal could be fully completed, President Gloria Macapagal Arroyo called the contract "onerous" and therefore formed a committee to evaluate the agreement to buy out Fraport AG. In May 2003, the Supreme Court declared the concession contract and the three supplemental construction and operations contracts as null and void due to various anomalies.

Certain amendments to the original contract caused the contract to be nullified. In December 2004, the Philippine government took over the terminal which led to expropriation proceedings. The government was then in the process of negotiating a contract with the builder of the terminal, Takenaka Corporation, because another factor that delayed the terminal's opening was the ongoing investigation into the collapse of an area of the terminal's ceiling days before its supposed opening in March 2006.

Piatco sued the government before the International Chamber of Commerce (ICC), while its German partner Fraport separately sued the Philippine government at the International Center for the Settlement of Investment Disputes (ICSID). In 2007, the ICSID case was decided in favor of the Philippine government because of a violation of the Anti-Dummy Law by Fraport. However, this decision was annulled in 2010 due to a violation of Fraport's right to be heard. A new claim by Fraport was filed at the ICSID in March 2011. Piatco formally withdrew its second application to set aside the earlier ICC ruling that dismissed its claims against the Philippine government in December 2011.

The ICC ruling in favor of the Philippine government became final and executory in 2012.

Contemporary history

Extortion scam reports

In October 2015, reports of an extortion scam concerning bullets planted by airport security officials in airline passengers' luggage (dubbed by the local media the "tanim-bala scam") spread, creating a scare among travelers. Former Davao City mayor Rodrigo Duterte, then a presumptive presidential candidate in the 2016 Philippine presidential election, further alleged that a syndicate was behind the series of incidents. Duterte said the operation had been going on for more than two years. Malacañang Palace and the Philippine Senate have since conducted an investigation of the incidents. Jose Angel Aquino Honrado, the chairman of MIAA, which manages the airport, is President Benigno Aquino III's first cousin. In April 2016, a similar incident occurred.

Rehabilitation and decongestion proposals
The consortium's airport rehabilitation and expansion proposal will be divided into two phases: the improvement and expansion of terminals in the current NAIA land area, and the development of an additional runway, taxiways, passenger terminals, and associated support infrastructure. Changi Airport Consultants Pte. Ltd., a wholly owned subsidiary of Changi Airports International Pte. Ltd., will provide technical support for their unsolicited proposal. Singapore's Changi Airport Group is also eyeing a 30-percent stake in this venture.

On March 1, 2018, Megawide Construction Corporation and its India-based consortium partner GMR Infrastructure, the consortium which revamped Mactan–Cebu International Airport, submitted a ₱150 billion, or US$3 billion, proposal to decongest and redevelop the airport as well. GMR-Megawide, unlike the aforementioned consortium, is not pushing for the construction of a new runway. According to GMR Megawide Mactan–Cebu International Airport Corp. chief executive adviser Andrew Harrison, such a structure would not significantly boost capacity.

The NAIA consortium pulled out of the rehabilitation project in July 2020 due to undisclosed issues, and thus Megawide-GMR took over the project. On December 15, 2020, however, the Manila International Airport Authority revoked the original proponent status (OPS) of Megawide-GMR, who then filed a motion for reconsideration on December 21. MIAA denied the motion for reconsideration filed by Megawide-GMR on January 25, 2021. In August 2022, the Department of Transportation announced a rebidding of the project within the year.

Terminal rationalization
In February 2018, a plan to "rationalize" the airport terminals was announced in an effort to decongest the airport, while transferring some flights to Clark International Airport. Under the rationalization program, Terminals 1 and 3 would be fully allocated to international flights, while Terminals 2 and 4 would be fully allocated to domestic flights. Airlines were initially given 45 days to transfer some of their flights to Clark International Airport, later extended to six months.

However, Senator Grace Poe said that the rationalization plan would not ease congestion in the airport, while saying that expanding the airport would be the main solution to decongest the airport.

On July 30, 2018, airport authorities announced the deferral of the rationalization program that was supposed to take place in August of that year. This was deferred due to operational constraints in the airport. The rationalization started in October 2018 when four airlines transferred their operations to Terminal 3 from Terminal 1 starting from that month until January 2019.

Terminals

Terminal 1

It is also known as the "Ninoy Aquino Terminal" since its tarmac was also the place where Marcos-era opposition senator Ninoy Aquino was assassinated in 1983. Being the second oldest terminal at the airport (after the Old Domestic Terminal, now called Terminal 4), Terminal 1 was completed in 1981 and opened in 1982. The terminal currently serves foreign carriers operating in Manila, except for those in Terminal 3 (All Nippon Airways, Cathay Pacific, Delta Air Lines, Emirates, Etihad Airways, KLM, Qantas, Qatar Airways, Singapore Airlines, Turkish Airlines and United Airlines). It also serves Philippine Airlines flights to and from Bali, Canada (Toronto and Vancouver), the Middle East, and the United States.

The development of the Manila International Airport was finally approved through the promulgation of Executive Order No. 381, which authorized the airport's development. In 1973, a feasibility study/airport master plan was done by the Airways Engineering Corporation through a US$29.6 million loan from the Asian Development Bank. The detailed engineering design for the project was done by Renardet-Sauti/Transplan/F.F. Cruz Consultant while the terminal's detailed architectural design was prepared by Leandro Locsin's L.V. Locsin and Associates. In 1974, the detailed designs were adopted by the Philippine Government. The designs were subsequently approved by the ADB on September 18, 1975. The government chose an area close to the original site of the former Manila Airport, deciding on an area of land governed by Parañaque, which was at the time a municipality of Metro Manila. Actual work on the terminal began during the second quarter of 1978.

The terminal reached capacity in 1991, when it registered a total passenger volume of 4.53 million. Since 1991, the terminal has been over capacity and has been recording an annual average growth rate of 11%, but improvements to the airport have increased its capacity from 4.5 million to six million passengers yearly. Compared to international terminals in other Asian countries, Terminal 1 has consistently ranked at the bottom due to limited and outdated facilities, poor passenger comfort, and crowding. From 2011 to 2013, Terminal 1 was on the list of worst airports in Asia and the world by the travel website "The Guide to Sleeping In Airports", ranking on number one.

Transport authorities planned to rehabilitate Terminal 1; the plans were approved by then-president Benigno Aquino III. The upgrade includes the expansion of the arrival area, addition of parking spaces, and improvement of other terminal facilities. Renovations began on January 23, 2014. The project included the installation of buckling restrained braces to strengthen the structural integrity of the building, and a much-needed improvement in the interior design of the terminal. Eleven international airlines operating from Terminal 1 transferred to Terminal 3 from 2014 to 2020, in an effort to decongest the terminal.

Terminal 2

Constructed as part of a master plan that recommended the construction of two new terminals, actual construction work on the terminal begun in December 1995 and was inaugurated on May 1, 1999 and began operations in the same year. It has been named the Centennial Terminal in commemoration of the centennial year of the declaration of Philippine independence. The terminal was originally designed by Aéroports de Paris to be a domestic terminal, but the design was later modified to accommodate international flights. It has a capacity of 2.5 million passengers per year in its international wing and five million in its domestic wing. It is able to be modified to accommodate nine million passengers per year if needed.

Terminal 2 is exclusively used by Philippine Airlines and PAL Express for all its domestic and most international flights. It is divided into two wings: the North Wing, for international flights, and the South Wing, which handles domestic operations. It currently has 12 jet bridges. There are several cafes and restaurants in the Terminal post-security. There is also a small duty-free section in the north wing. The need for two more terminals was proposed by a Master Plan Review of the Airport that was undertaken in 1989 by Aéroports de Paris (ADP). The study was facilitated by means of a grant from the French Government. The review cost 2.9 million French francs and was submitted to the Philippine Government for evaluation in 1990.

In 1991, the French government granted a 30-million-franc soft loan to the Philippine government, which was to be used to cover the detailed architectural and engineering design of NAIA Terminal 2. ADP completed the design in 1992 and in 1994, the Japanese Government granted an 18.12-billion-yen soft loan to the Philippine Government to finance 75% of the terminal's construction costs and 100% of the supervision costs. Construction of the Centennial Terminal began on December 11, 1995, and was formally turned over to the government of the Philippines on December 28, 1998. The terminal became fully operational by 1999.

In August 2014, a plan to expand Terminal 2 was announced. The plan also incorporated building a structure interconnecting Terminals 1 and 2. It included the demolition of the unused Philippine Village Hotel complex beside the terminal, and the relocation of a fuel depot located between the terminals to make way for the expansion.

The terminal underwent rehabilitation starting in September 2018. On February 16, 2021, the expanded Terminal 2 was inaugurated. The expansion added an additional  in the terminal area.

The Manila International Airport Authority plans to convert the terminal into an all-domestic terminal after the Holy Week in April 2023.

Terminal 3

Terminal 3 is the newest and largest among the four terminals in NAIA. The construction of the terminal was also part of the 1989 expansion plan. Construction started in 1997 and was originally planned to open in 2002. Since construction, the terminal has been at the center of legal battles, red tape, and arbitration cases in both the United States and Singapore, as well as technical and safety concerns which delayed its opening several times. The terminal opened on July 22, 2008, increasing the airport's annual handling capacity by 13 million passengers. It is built on a  lot that sits on Villamor Air Base.

Terminal 3 is used as the main terminal for Cebu Pacific for its domestic and international operations; the airline has operated its flights in the terminal since its opening in 2008. PAL Express (formerly Air Philippines and Airphil Express) used to operate flights at the terminal until it moved to Terminal 2 in 2018. The terminal is also used by the AirAsia Group for its international flights, as well as flights operated by Philippines AirAsia to and from Cebu and Caticlan. It is also used by foreign airlines that previously operated at Terminal 1.

It also has 29 restroom blocks. The departure area has five entrances all equipped with X-ray machines with the final security check having 18 X-ray machines. Its baggage claim has seven large baggage carousels, each with its own flight display monitor. A four-level shopping mall connects the terminal and parking buildings. The parking building has a capacity of 2,000 cars and the outdoor parking area has a capacity of 1,200 cars. The terminal is capable of servicing 33,000 passengers daily at peak or 6,000 passengers per hour. A  footbridge that opened in April 2017, known as Runway Manila, connects the terminal with Newport City. The bridge contains moving walkways and can accommodate about 2,000 persons at any given time.

All international operations, except for those from PAL, were intended to operate from Terminal 3 in the future, originally proposed to move in the fourth quarter of 2010; however, Cebu Pacific and PAL Express remained the only tenants for the first two years of its operation. Prior to the start of full operations of Terminal 3, the vast majority of international flights operated from Terminal 1. All Nippon Airways became the first foreign-based carrier to operate out of Terminal 3 starting February 27, 2011.

The terminal underwent a rehabilitation under the contractor Takenaka Corporation to improve its facilities and utilize the whole terminal. Previously, it only operated at half of its capacity awaiting the completion of the remaining system works. The terminal became fully operational on July 31, 2014, leading to the transfer of five international airlines to Terminal 3 to ease congestion at Terminal 1, starting with Delta Air Lines on August 1, followed by KLM on August 4, Emirates on August 15, Singapore Airlines on September 1, and Cathay Pacific on October 1. Both United Airlines and Qantas relocated to Terminal 3 from Terminal 1 on October 28, 2018. Middle Eastern carriers Qatar Airways and Turkish Airlines transferred to Terminal 3 on December 1, 2018, and January 1, 2019, respectively. Etihad Airways was also transferred to Terminal 3 on October 25, 2020.

Terminal 4

Terminal 4, named the "Manila Domestic Passenger Terminal", and still known as the Old Domestic Terminal, is the oldest of the four existing terminals, having been built in 1948. With an annual capacity of three million passengers, it serves all domestic flights within the Philippines that are operated by AirSWIFT, Cebgo, and most Philippines AirAsia flights, among others. There are no jet bridges and passengers walk to and from the aircraft or are occasionally bussed. Twenty-six check-in counters are located in the terminal. The departure hall has the seating capacity for 969 people at a time. Several food stores and a book and magazine stall are also available. Five baggage carousels are located in the terminal while domestic airline offices, banks, restaurants and a grocery store are also located right beside the domestic passenger terminal. The Domestic Terminal is on the old Airport Road near the north end of Runway 13/31. An old hangar has since been annexed to the terminal.

Due to the COVID-19 pandemic, and in an effort to reduce operating costs due to low passenger demand, Terminal 4 remained closed while the other three terminals reopened in June 2020 after the enhanced community quarantine in Luzon was lifted. This caused domestic flights that used to operate at Terminal 4 to transfer to Terminal 3. During its closure, the terminal was used as a vaccination site for employees of the airport. After a two-year hiatus, Terminal 4 reopened on March 28, 2022, in an effort to decongest Terminal 3 due to the influx of domestic passengers. Cebgo, Philippines AirAsia, and AirSWIFT returned its domestic operations to the terminal on the same day.

Structure

Runways
The primary runway was oriented at 06/24 in order to harness the southeast and southwest winds. Runway 13/31 is the original runway of the complex during the airport's time as the USAF base Nichols Field. Out of the 550 planes that fly on NAIA daily, 100 of them take the secondary runway. It mostly caters to small private planes, propeller aircraft such as the ATR 72-500, Airbus A320, and Airbus A321 aircraft, and acts as the main runway of the NAIA Terminal 4.

Runway 13/31 was closed in 2020 to give way for its rehabilitation works. The runway was inaugurated and reopened on February 16, 2021, along with a newly constructed taxiway that opened on the same day.

Third runway plan
Former Transportation Secretary Joseph Abaya has proposed a new runway adjacent to the existing Runway 06/24. The proposed runway has a length of  that could allow the landing of an Airbus A320 and increase the number of aircraft that the airport can handle from 40 planes per hour to about 60–70. However, according to the consultant hired by the government, building the runway may affect the current operations in the main runway and considering building another terminal to be less disruptive.

Previously, the Japan International Cooperation Agency proposed Sangley Point in Cavite as the site of the new international airport serving the Greater Manila Area, meaning Sangley could serve as NAIA's third runway until the long-term expansion is planned.

Airbus A380 capability

NAIA is one of two airports in the Philippines that meet the infrastructure requirements for the Airbus A380, the other being Clark International Airport. The airport provides MRO services conducted by Lufthansa Technik Philippines. On October 11, 2007, NAIA hosted the debut of the Airbus A380 in the Philippines, after test aircraft MSN009 (registered as F-WWEA) landed on Runway 24. The test flight demonstrated that the A380 could land on existing runways in Asia and that the primary international airport of the Philippines can support aircraft as large as the A380.

However, according to Jose Angel Honrado, who served as MIAA General Manager from 2010 to 2016, NAIA is currently not capable of handling regular commercial flights on the A380, as it would "cause a lot of inconvenience and delay for other scheduled flights" due to the airport's runway and taxiway centerlines not reaching the "wing-tip-to-wing-tip clearance" safety requirement for the aircraft to operate at the airport on a regular basis. Therefore, no airlines have regular commercial flights using this aircraft, although some airlines fly out their A380s to NAIA for maintenance at Lufthansa Technik Philippines. On October 7, 2014, Emirates flew their A380 to NAIA in a one-off commercial flight from and to Dubai to commemorate the transfer of the airline's operations to Terminal 3. In command of the flight was Capt. Franklyn Desiderio, the first Filipino pilot certified to fly the Airbus A380.

Facilities

Lufthansa Technik Philippines
Lufthansa Technik Philippines (LTP) (formerly PAL Technical Center) was founded in 2000 as a joint venture of German firm Lufthansa Technik (51%) and Philippine aviation service provider MacroAsia Corporation (49%). Lufthansa Technik Philippines offers aircraft maintenance, repair and overhaul (MRO) services to customers.

The company focuses on maintenance checks for the Airbus A320 family and A330/A340 aircraft. Seven hangar bays and workshops have been upgraded to the latest industry standards to support aircraft maintenance, major modifications, cabin reconfigurations, engine maintenance and painting for the Airbus A320 family, A330/A340, as well as the Boeing 747-400 and 777 aircraft. A new widebody hangar was recently added to meet the increasing demand for A330/A340 base maintenance checks.

The company also opened an Airbus A380 maintenance hangar to allow the aircraft to be repaired at the airport facility. Lufthansa Technik Philippines opens A380 maintenance hangar. In July 2012, A Qantas Airbus A380 completed its passenger cabin reconfiguration. It is one of the 12 Airbus A380 that was cabin reconfigured in the LTP Manila's facility. It also provides total technical and engineering support for the entire Philippine Airlines fleet and other international airline fleets as well.

Aviation Partnership (Philippines) Corporation
Aviation Partnership (Philippines) Corporation is SIA Engineering's third line maintenance joint venture outside Singapore. The joint venture of SIA Engineering Company (51%) and Cebu Pacific Air (49%) provides line maintenance, light aircraft checks and technical ramp handling as well as other services to Cebu Pacific Air and third-party airline customers.

DHL
The airport also serves as a gateway facility of the logistics company DHL. On March 12, 2006, the company opened its first quality control center at NAIA Terminal 3 to show support in its local market.

Philippine Airlines 
Philippine Airlines operates several aviation facilities in the Philippines. These include various training facilities for pilots and cabin crew, catering services, as well as a data center and an A320 flight simulator.

Philippine Airlines also maintains training facilities both for its pilots and other crew, composed of the PAL Aviation School, the PAL Technical Center, and the PAL Learning Center. The PAL Aviation School, located within the premises of Clark Civil Aviation Complex, provides flight training for its own operations and as well as for other airlines, the Philippine government and individual students. It currently operates ten Cessna 172Rs, five of which is fitted with a Glass Cockpit Garmin G1000 for student pilots' training with complete training facilities including simulators for the Airbus A320 and for turboprop aircraft (FRASCA 142). More than 5,000 students graduated from the PAL Aviation School, eventually joining the ranks of pilots at PAL and other airlines.

PAL Learning Center, located in Manila, serves as the integrated center for Philippine Airlines flight deck crew, cabin crew, catering, technical, ticketing and ground personnel. Located at the PAL Maintenance Base Complex in Pasay, the PAL flight simulator, designed to simulate an Airbus A320, can duplicate all flight conditions complete with sound and visual system capability for day, dusk and night operations.

Airlines and destinations

Passenger

Notes

Cargo

Notes
Philippine Airlines also maintains integrated airport ground handling services, cargo operations and a full catering service for it and other airlines. This is composed of PAL Airport Services, Philippine Airlines Cargo and the PAL Inflight Center.
Based at both the Centennial Terminal (Terminal 2) and International Cargo Terminal of Ninoy Aquino International Airport, PAL Airport Services offers ground handling for seven international airlines calling at Manila, while Philippine Airlines Cargo processes and ships an average of 200 tonnes of Manila publications and 2 tonnes of mail daily throughout the country and 368 tonnes of cargo abroad daily.

Statistics
Data from Airports Council International and the Manila International Airport Authority.

Notes

Ground transportation

Inter-terminal transportation
The Manila International Airport Authority runs a shuttle bus system which connects all four terminals for passengers who have onward connections on flights departing from another terminal. Shuttle buses run every fifteen minutes during daytime hours, but passengers are required to clear immigration and customs to use the system.

Philippine Airlines operates an airside shuttle service between Terminals 1, 2 and 3 for passengers connecting to onward PAL Express flights and vice versa.

External connections

Bus

Ultimate Bus Experience (UBE Express) operates a Premium Airport Bus Service that serves on all NAIA Terminals and hotels and commercial areas located in the cities of Manila, Makati, Muntinlupa, Quezon City, Pasay, and Parañaque, all in Metro Manila, and the city of Santa Rosa in Laguna. It also has stops at JAM Liner, Philtranco and Victory Liner terminals in Pasay for passengers going to/coming from the provinces of Northern and Southern Luzon. These buses pick-up exclusively at Terminal 3 and drop-off at any of the four Terminals.

HM Transport provides an Airport loop shuttle bus and Premium Point-to-point bus service from Taft Avenue MRT Station and Alabang in Muntinlupa to NAIA Terminal 3. Genesis Transport also provides Premium Point-to-point bus service to Clark International Airport from NAIA Terminal 3. Saulog Transit also provides Premium Point-to-point bus service to Sangley Point Airport in Cavite City from NAIA.

In addition, a city bus route between Diliman in Quezon City and Parañaque Integrated Terminal Exchange serve the airport.

Jeepney
All four terminals are also served by local jeepney routes serving Parañaque and Pasay.

Rail

The airport is connected, albeit indirectly, by rail: Baclaran station of the Manila LRT Line 1 and Nichols station of the Philippine National Railways both serve the airport complex.

In the future, with the extension of the existing LRT Line 1, a new station, Manila International Airport station, is set to connect the airport, albeit still indirectly, to the LRT-1. A four-station spur extension of the LRT Line 1, directly connecting Terminal 3 to Baclaran, is also proposed.

Under the new LRT Line 6 proposal, a station will be built near Terminal 1. Once approved, it will directly connect Cavite province with NAIA.

A station of the Metro Manila Subway line will connect the airport directly by rail.

Road

The NAIA Expressway or NAIA Skyway is the first airport expressway and second elevated tollway in the Philippines. It starts from Sales Interchange of Skyway at the boundary of Pasay and Taguig and ends in Entertainment City, Parañaque. The access ramps of the expressway connects with Terminals 1, 2 and 3 of the airport and also connects with Macapagal Boulevard for motorists and commuters going to/coming from Manila and Manila-Cavite Expressway or CAVITEx for motorists and commuters travelling to/from the province of Cavite.

Renaming proposals
There have been several efforts to rename the airport. In May 2018, lawyer Larry Gadon led an online petition at change.org aiming to restore the original name of the airport, Manila International Airport (MIA). Gadon said the renaming of MIA to NAIA in 1987 was "well in advance of the 10-year prescription period for naming public sites after dead personalities".

In June 2020, House Deputy Speaker Paolo Duterte, citing the need of the airport to represent the Filipino people, filed a bill seeking to rename the airport to Paliparang Pandaigdig ng Pilipinas. The bill was also authored by Marinduque Representative Lord Allan Velasco and ACT-CIS Representative Eric Go Yap.

In August 2020, Gadon filed a petition before the Supreme Court questioning the validity of Republic Act No. 6639, the law which renamed the Manila International Airport to Ninoy Aquino International Airport (NAIA). Gadon asserted that Senator Benigno Aquino Jr. is not among the "pantheon" of the country's declared official heroes. A month later, the Supreme Court unanimously denied for lack of merit the petition to declare the law null and void.

In April 2022, Duterte Youth Representative Ducielle Cardema filed a bill renaming the airport to its original name, Manila International Airport, and stressed the name should not have been "politicized in the first place". Cardema refiled a similar bill in July 2022.

In June 2022, Negros Oriental 3rd district Representative Arnolfo Teves Jr. filed a bill renaming the airport to Ferdinand E. Marcos International Airport after former president Ferdinand Marcos, who authorized the airport's rehabilitation and development through an executive order in 1972. Teves stressed that it is "more appropriate to rename it to the person who has contributed to the idea and execution of the said noble project".

Accidents and incidents 
On July 25, 1971, a Pan American World Airways Boeing 707-321C named "Clipper Rising Sun" was on a cargo flight from San Francisco via Honolulu, Guam and Manila to Saigon. All 4 occupants were killed.
On November 15, 1974, an Orient Air System and Integrated Services Douglas C-47A registered RP-C570 was damaged beyond economical repair when a forced landing was made in a paddy field shortly after take-off from Manila International Airport following failure of the starboard engine. One of the eight people on board was killed.
On February 7, 1980, a China Airlines Boeing 707 from Taipei Chiang Kai-Shek International Airport operating as Flight 811 undershot the runway on landing and caught fire. Of all the 135 on board, there were only 2 fatalities.
 On September 15, 1981, a Korean Airlines Boeing 747 originating from Seoul, South Korea, and bound for Zürich, Switzerland, overshot the runway during takeoff and hit the airport perimeter fence, with its nose blocking traffic on the service road of South Luzon Expressway. The plane had a one-hour layover in Manila when the accident happened. Forty out of the 332 passengers and 20 crew were injured.
 On December 13, 1983, a Philair Douglas C-47B registered RP-C287 crashed shortly after takeoff following an engine failure. The aircraft was on a non-scheduled passenger flight. All ten people on board survived.
 On April 28, 1989, a MATS Douglas C-47A registered RP-C81 crashed shortly after takeoff on a non-scheduled domestic passenger flight to Roxas Airport following an engine failure. MATS did not have a licence to fly passengers. Seven of the 22 passengers were killed. The aircraft had earlier made a forced landing on a taxiway at the airport.
On May 6, 1989, a Manila Aero Transport System (MATS) Douglas C-47A registered RP-C82 crashed on takeoff following an engine failure. The aircraft was being used on a domestic non-scheduled passenger flight although it was not licensed to carry passengers. All 18 people on board survived.
 On July 21, 1989, a Philippine Airlines BAC One-Eleven operating Flight 124 overran a runway in poor visibility and heavy rain. No passengers or crew on board were killed but eight people on the ground were killed when the jet crossed a road.
On May 11, 1990, a Philippine Airlines Boeing 737-300 operating Flight 143 suffered an explosion in the center fuel tank near the terminal of the airport while preparing for takeoff. The fire and smoke engulfed the aircraft before it could be completely evacuated. The explosion was similar to what happened to TWA Flight 800 six years later. Eight people died.
On May 18, 1990, an Aerolift Philippines Beechcraft 1900C-1 operating a domestic scheduled passenger flight bound for Surigao Airport crashed into a residential area following takeoff. The aircraft reportedly suffered an engine failure. All 21 occupants and 4 people on the ground were killed.
On September 4, 2002, an Asian Spirit de Havilland Canada Dash 7-102 operating Flight 897, carrying 49 occupants, was the last flight of the day to Caticlan and departed the Manila domestic airport at 15:36 for a one-hour flight. On approach to Caticlan Airport, the right main gear failed to deploy. The approach was abandoned and the crew decided to return to Manila for an emergency landing. The plane circled for about 35 minutes over Las Piñas to burn off fuel. The crew then carried out an emergency landing with the right gear retracted on Manila's international airport runway 24. After touchdown, the aircraft swerved off the runway onto a grassy area. There were no reported injuries or fatalities, but the aircraft was written off.
On November 11, 2002, a Laoag International Airlines Fokker F27 operating Flight 585 took off from Manila runway 31 just after 6 o'clock for a flight to Laoag International Airport. Shortly after takeoff, engine trouble developed in the aircraft's left engine. The pilot declared an emergency and he tried to land the plane but decided at the last minute to ditch it into the sea.
On August 23, 2009, a South East Asian Airlines Dornier 328 registered RP-C6328 operating Flight 624 was hit by strong crosswinds when decelerating after landing on runway 13. The aircraft veered off the runway and came to a stop in the grass. None of the 32 passengers and 3 crews was injured. The airport had to be temporarily closed to tow the aircraft away.
On October 17, 2009, a Victoria Air Douglas DC-3, registered RP-C550, crashed shortly after takeoff on a flight to Puerto Princesa International Airport after an engine malfunctioned. The plane crashed near a factory in Las Piñas. All on board died.
 On December 10, 2011, a Beechcraft 65–80 Queen Air cargo plane en route to San Jose crashed into the Felixberto Serrano Elementary School in Parañaque, Metro Manila. The plane crashed after takeoff straight into the school. The cause of the crash was pilot error. At least 14 people including 3 crew members on board the aircraft died, and over 20 people were injured. Approximately 50 houses in the residential area were set ablaze by the subsequent fire.
 On August 16, 2018, Xiamen Airlines Flight 8667 crash-landed amidst heavy monsoon rains. The 737-800 skidded off the end of the runway. All 157 passengers and crew were unharmed, however, the aircraft was written off. According to Flightradar24 data, the flight aborted its first landing attempt.
On December 14, 2019, Jetstar Japan Flight 40, an Airbus A320 bound for Narita, experienced a runway excursion while positioning for takeoff at Runway 13/31. All 140 passengers and crew evacuated safely.
On March 29, 2020, a Lionair IAI Westwind registered RP-C5880 burst into flames on the airport's runway 24 as it was taking off. The plane was conducting a medical evacuation mission bound for Haneda Airport, Japan. All eight occupants consisting of three aircraft crew, three medical crew, and two passengers on board the aircraft died.
On March 8, 2022, Cebgo Flight 6112 from Naga utilizing an ATR 72-600 aircraft experienced a runway excursion while landing. Following the incident, all 46 passengers and crew disembarked safely, and no injuries were reported.
On June 20, 2022, Saudia Flight 862 from Riyadh veered off a taxiway after landing. All 420 passengers and crews disembarked the Boeing 777 aircraft with no injuries.
On January 1, 2023, a power outage at CAAP's Air Traffic Management Center in the airport resulted in 282 flights being cancelled or diverted and left 56,000 passengers stranded.

See also

 Nichols Field
Colonel Jesus Villamor Air Base
 List of airports in the Philippines
 List of airports in the Greater Manila Area

Notes and references

Notes

References

Further reading

 Fraport AG and the NAIA-3 Debacle: A Case Study Ben Kritz, GR Business Online © 2011

External links

 Manila International Airport Authority
 
 
 Interactive satellite view of NAIA

Airports in the Philippines
Transportation in Metro Manila
Buildings and structures in Parañaque
Buildings and structures in Pasay
Tourism in Manila
Tourism in Metro Manila
Transportation in Luzon
Airports established in 1948
1948 establishments in the Philippines